Francisco Pizarro is a town and municipality in the Nariño Department, Colombia named after the Spanish explorer Francisco Pizarro.

Isla del Gallo, where the Famous Thirteen decided to continue the exploration of Peru, belongs to this municipality.

Climate
Francisco Pizarro has a very wet tropical rainforest climate (Köppen Af).

References

External links
 Town and Municipality of Francisco Pizarro official website

Municipalities of Nariño Department